Ottery St Mary railway station is a closed railway station that served the town of Ottery St Mary, in Devon, England. It was opened in 1874 on the Sidmouth Railway, but was closed in 1967 due to the Beeching Axe.

History

Passenger and freight services were withdrawn in 1967.

Present state
The station building is now a youth club. The remaining site is now an industrial estate.

References

Disused railway stations in Devon
Railway stations in Great Britain opened in 1874
Railway stations in Great Britain closed in 1967
Former London and South Western Railway stations
Beeching closures in England
Ottery St Mary